The Milwaukee City Conference (also known as "City Conference") is a high school athletic conference in Milwaukee, Wisconsin.  All full-time member institutions are located in the city of Milwaukee and are members of the Milwaukee Public Schools system.  Its members participate in WIAA Division 1.

Membership

Affiliate members 
The following schools are members of the City Conference on a part-time basis :
Milwaukee High School of the Arts
Malcolm X Academy
Metropolitan High School
Ronald W. Reagan College Preparatory High School
Milwaukee School of Languages
Thomas Edison High School
Wisconsin Conservatory of Lifelong Learning

Co-op teams 
Several co-op teams exist in the conference. These co-op teams usually include a full-time member and an affiliate member. The "host" school is listed in bold.

Bay View & Wisconsin Conservatory of Lifelong Learning (football, boys' & girls' tennis)
Pulaski & Milwaukee High School of the Arts (football, girls' volleyball, baseball, boys' tennis, girls' soccer)
Marshall & School Of Languages (football)
Ronald W. Reagan & Wisconsin Conservatory of Lifelong Learning (girls' basketball)
Madison, Marshall, & School Of Languages (boys' tennis)
South Division & Bradley Tech (boys' tennis)
Pulaski, Milwaukee High School of the Arts, and Ronald W. Reagan (girls' and boys' swimming)
Riverside and Shorewood (wrestling)

Sanctioned sports 
Boys and girls
Basketball
Cross country
Swimming
Tennis
Track and field
Boys only
Baseball
Football
Wrestling
Girls only
Softball
Volleyball

WIAA championships

Softball 
Bay View won the lone state championship for City Conference members in 1985. The Redcats also advanced to the state tournament in 1981, 1982, 1986, 1990 and 1991. Bay View won 111 straight conference games from 1985-91.

Spring Baseball 
Bradley Tech (formerly Boys Tech) won the lone state championship for City Conference members in 1948, the inaugural year.

Boys' basketball 
The City Conference did not allow its teams to compete in the WIAA tournament until the 1951-52 season. The now disbanded Lincoln High School became the first City team to win the state title in 1959. It won four more state titles (1961, 1962, 1966, and 1967).

Hamilton won the Class A title in 1972, the first year in which separate tournaments were held based on enrollment size. Three city schools won consecutive titles when Milwaukee Tech (1979), North Division (1980) and Madison (1981) each took home a Class A crown.  Milwaukee Tech (now Bradley Tech) repeated its success in 1983.

Since then, 14 titles have gone to one of three City schools: Rufus King (1984, 1991, 1995, 2003, 2004), Washington (1985, 1987, 1990, 1993) and Vincent (1996, 1997, 1998, 2000, 2001).

Boys' track and field 
South Division put together a string of five consecutive Class A (now Division 1) titles from 1985 to 1989. Vincent has won three Division 1 titles in boys' track and field (2001, 2003 and 2005). North Division (1992) and Bradley Tech (1995) have each claimed a Division 1 title. King won in 2006.

Girls' basketball 
Washington is one of three City Conference team to have won the WIAA Division 1 title five times, a public school record. Its first Class A title came in 1979, and its second in 1990. The team accomplished the first three-peat in girls' tournament history (in any division), winning the title in 1994, 1995 and 1996. Vincent has also won the title three times: 2007, 2008 and 2009. Riverside won its first WIAA Division 1 title in 2013.

Girls' track and field 
Since the WIAA Class A/Division 1 tournament was established in 1972, the following City schools have won: Custer (1976), Riverside (1986, 2012), Bradley Tech (1996, 2009, 2010, 2011) and Rufus King (1989, 2002, 2016). Athletes from the member schools hold five individual and three relay-team state tournament records.

Controversy 
Recently the WIAA decided to restrict travel outside Wisconsin and its border states. The decision was made as a response to the practice of City Conference boys' basketball teams, which often traveled long distances to find competition. Athletic directors from City schools argued against the decision, saying the travel was paid for by the host school or event organizer.

The situation has caused some supporters to call for the City Conference to follow the lead of leagues in other major cities, such as Chicago and Philadelphia, to hold its own tournaments separate from the WIAA.

See also 
List of high school athletic conferences in Wisconsin

References

External links and resources 
Milwaukee City Conference pages at Wissports.net
Football (Blackbourn Division)
Football (Richardson Division)
Boys Basketball
Girls Basketball
Milwaukee Journal-Sentinel Preps Plus Online

High school sports associations in the United States
Sports in Milwaukee
Wisconsin high school sports conferences